Madhava Varma II was the most successful ruler of the Vishnukundina dynasty, controlling parts of the Deccan and eastern coast of India in the mid-5th century AD. He is regarded as the greatest ruler of his dynasty. The Vishnukundina Empire reached its greatest territorial extent under him. It was during this period the Vishnukundina dynasty was raised, in its own estimation, to the imperial dignity.

The most notable military achievement of Madhava Varma II was his victory over the Vakataka emperor Prithvishena II. The daughter of Prithvishena II, Vakataka Mahadevi, was given in marriage to Madhava Varma II.

Early life
He was the son of Govinda Varma I and his wife Mahadevi. He had two sons - Vikramendra Varma and Deva Varma.

Reign
His predecessor was Madhava Varma I (c. 420 – c. 455). He is considered as the greatest ruler of the Vishnukundina dynasty. The Vishnukundina Empire reached its greatest territorial extent under him. He defeated Prithvishena II, the powerful Vakataka king. The daughter of Prithvishena II, Vakataka Mahadevi, was given in marriage to Madhava Varma II.

He occupied Kalinga and invaded the Pallavas of Kanchipuram in his 33rd regnal year. He wrote 'Janasraya'. he had an epithet- 'Trivara Nagara Bhavnagata Sundari Hridaya Nandana' ( The one who brought happiness to the beautiful maidens living in the buildings of the city of Trivara)

After occupying these areas from the Ananda Gotrikas, Madhava Varma II made Amarapura, modern Dharanikota, near the Amaravati Stupa) his capital. Keeping in view the constant threat from the Pallavas, he created an outpost to check their activities and appointed his son, Deva Varma and after his death the grandson Madhava Varma III as its Viceroy.

Military strength
Madhava Varma II appears to have been a powerful warlord, with an army consisting 800 elephants, 1500 cavalry horses, 23 Chariots and many foot soldiers. This is Mentioned in Ipur Plates of Vishnukundina dynasty

Their army consisted of traditional fourfold divisions:

 Elephants
 Chariots
 Cavalry
 Infantry

The Hastikosa was the officer-in-charge of elephant forces and the Virakosa was the officer-in-charge of land forces. These officers issued even grants on behalf of the kings.

Extent of the Kingdom
East –Bay of Bengal

West – Arabian sea

North – Reva, Narmada river.

South – Southern sea. May be Pulicat lake.

Andhra Pradesh, Telangana, Southern Madhya Pradesh Maharashtra,Southern Odisha and Northern Karnataka

In Maharashtra Satara District One of Madhava Varma II inscriptions was found in Maharashtra.
Vishnukundinas coins were found in all over Maharashtra, Madhya Pradesh

Religion
All the records of the Vishnukundinas and the kings prior to the Madhava Varma II seem to be patrons of Hinduism.

Inscriptions

It is stated in the Tummalagudem Plates II that by his Madhava Varma II seized the royalty of the kings of
other dynasties and that his authority extended over the region
surrounded hy the eastern southern and western seas and the
river Reva (Narmada) in the north. It is also stated that his
kingdom was hounded hy the western sea and the river Seva in the
north.

From Velpuru inscription we learn that he led his army
southward across the river Krishna with a view to ecnquer the
Guntur region. It speaks of his presence in military camp
at Velpuru probably during the course of a war with the Pallavas,

Madhava Varma II extended his kingdom upto Narmada, exterminated the Salankayana Dynasty at Vengi, subjugated the rulers of
Pishtapura and Srikakulam and thus expended his kingdom to the
eastern sea. He vanquished the Pallavas and annexed northern
parts of Guntur district to his Kingdom.

Khanapur plates:

Place: Satara district, Maharashtra.

The second plate mentions Maharaja Madhava Varma II who was a Sarvabhouma(emperor) and who performed the all ritual and  asvamedha sacrifices. Defeated the Vakataka King Prithvishena II, and Married the Princess of Vakataka Mahadevi, He had the title of chaturvamsa, chaturasrama, dharm-karmasetu.

References

History of India
Vakataka dynasty